More Mission Impossible is an album featuring music composed and conducted by Lalo Schifrin recorded in 1968 and released on the Paramount label. As with Music from Mission: Impossible (1967) the music on this album is rerecorded and extended scores that were originally commissioned for the TV series Mission: Impossible.

The liner notes were written by JazzTimes music critic Harvey Siders. He said that "each track could be lifted right out of context and stand alone as a compact treatise on rock-tinged, big-band jazz." He described "Mission Blues" as blues with a boogie woogie rhythm and funk elements, and noticed that "Self-Destruct" contained a "rarity: a jazz chimes solo" from the percussion department. He said that the "Danube Incident" was peacefully atmospheric, featuring the exotic Eastern European sound of the cymbalom.

In 1994, Portishead sampled the track "Danube Incident" for their song "Sour Times", slowing the original tune down in tempo which also lowered its pitch. "Sour Times" became Portishead's most successful single.

Track listing
All compositions by Lalo Schifrin except as indicated
 "Mission Blues" – 2:47 	
 "Self-Destruct" – 2:37 	
 "Affair in Madrid" – 2:31 	
 "Midnight Courier" – 3:25 	
 "The Chelsea Memorandum" (Shorty Rogers) – 2:59 	
 "More Mission" – 2:45 	
 "Intrigue" – 2:30 	
 "Danube Incident" – 1:52 	
 "Foul Play" (Richard Hazard) – 2:29 	
 "The Getaway" – 2:22 	
 "Mission: Impossible" – 2:31 	
Recorded in Los Angeles, California on October 23 and 26, 1968

Personnel
Lalo Schifrin – arranger, composer, conductor
Conte Candoli, Graham Young, John Audino, Bobby Bryant – trumpet 
Lloyd Ulyate, Dick Nash, Dick Noel, Milt Bernhart, George Roberts – trombone
Bud Shank, Ronny Lang, Plas Johnson, John Lowe, Gene Cipriano – reeds
Mike Melvoin – piano, electric piano, organ
Tommy Tedesco, Howard Roberts – guitar 
Ray Brown – bass
Carol Kaye – electric bass
Larry Bunker, Ken Watson, Emil Richards, Francisco Aguabella – percussion
Robert Helfer – orchestra manager
Dick Hazard, Milt Rogers – arranger, composer
John Neal – engineer
Apple Graphics – album design
Christopher Whorf – art direction

References

Lalo Schifrin albums
1969 albums
Albums arranged by Lalo Schifrin
Paramount Records (1969) albums